The Armenian school in Limassol, as of 1972 called "Nareg", after Saint Krikor Naregatsi, is located on 16, Vassilis Michaelides street in central Limassol, next to Sourp Kevork church. The current building was built between 2006 and 2007 by the Technical Services of the Ministry of Education and Culture and was inaugurated on 5 November 2008 by the President of Cyprus Demetris Christofias.

The first Armenian school in Limassol operated in 1928, by initiative of Armenian Archbishop Bedros Saradjian, at the house of Siranoush Avedikian on Zena Gunther street. After the Sourp Kevork church was erected (1939–1940), lessons were held inside the church. In 1951, by initiative of priest Shahé Semerdjian and a donation by Ethiopian-Armenian Roupen Babigian, the initial building of the Armenian National School was built, which was inaugurated on 17 November 1951. In 1954, by donation of the Limassol Armenian youth, the building was expanded and as of then, all lessons were held inside the school.

References

1928 establishments in Cyprus
Armenian diaspora in Cyprus
Armenian schools
buildings and structures in Limassol
high schools and secondary schools in Cyprus